Betamethadol (INN), or β-methadol, also known as betametadol, is a synthetic opioid analgesic. It is an isomer of dimepheptanol (methadol), the other being alphamethadol (α-methadol). Betamethadol is composed of two isomers itself, L-β-methadol, and D-β-methadol. Based on structure-activity relationships it can be inferred that both isomers are likely to be active as opioid analgesics, similarly to those of betacetylmethadol (β-acetylmethadol).

See also 
 Dimepheptanol
 Alphamethadol
 Betacetylmethadol

References 

Secondary alcohols
Dimethylamino compounds
Analgesics
Mu-opioid receptor agonists
Synthetic opioids